Brooke Wentz is an American record producer and music director. She has served as a music director for ESPN. She was also the recipient of the Billboard Music Award for the best world music album in 1994, Global Meditation - Authentic Music from Meditative Traditions of the World.

Education
Wentz graduated magna cum laude from Barnard College. She also graduated with an M.B.A. from Columbia University.

Career
Wentz began her career in the 1980s as a public radio host for stations such as New York's WKCR-FM, where she hosted the music program Transfigured Night. She eventually became new music director of WKCR.

After her career in public radio, Wentz served as Manager of A&R Administration at Arista Records. While visiting the FESPACO Film Festival in Burkina Faso, Wentz was an eyewitness to the events of the 1991 Malian coup d'etat alongside Malian musician Salif Keita. She wrote about the incident in an article for the music periodical The Beat.

In 1992, Wentz produced the compilation album Global Meditation. The album featured meditative music from several world religious traditions. Global Meditation went on to win the Billboard Music Award for best world music album in 1994. In 1994, Wentz produced another compilation album of African music, titled Africa: Never Stand Still. In 1995, Wentz also produced the compilation album Global Divas, which featured contributions from female artists such as Patsy Cline, Aretha Franklin, Lydia Mendoza, and Celia Cruz. The album was produced to promote the United Nations Fourth World Conference on Women.

By 1996, Wentz had become the music director of ESPN. Wentz was one of the first music directors who licensed music for the X Games and supervised a compilation album for the event.

In 2000, Wentz also served as the music producer for New York City's Times Square Millennium Celebration. In 2002, Wentz founded the music supervision company The Rights Workshop. The Rights Workshop has provided music for film and television productions including Melancholia, Bill Cunningham New York, and Don't Stop Believin': Everyman's Journey.

In 2007, Wentz's first book, Hey, That's My Music! Music Supervision, Licensing, and Content Acquisition was published by Hal Leonard Books.

Wentz founded Seven Seas Music in 2014. Seven Seas Music has licensed music for use films such as the films No Escape and Knight of Cups, as well as the television series Anthony Bourdain: Parts Unknown and Criminal Minds.

Wentz's second book, Music Rights Unveiled: A Filmmaker's Guide to Music Rights and Licensing, was published in 2017 by Taylor & Francis. She co-wrote the book in collaboration with Maryam Battaglia.

Discography

References

Living people
American record producers
Barnard College alumni
Columbia Business School alumni
Year of birth missing (living people)